The following is a list of awards and nominations received by Mexican filmmaker and author Guillermo del Toro. He has received nominations for seven Academy Awards, winning three, and five Golden Globe Awards, with two wins. He has also won three BAFTA Awards, three Critics' Choice Movie Awards, two Annie Awards, a Producers Guild of America Award, a Directors Guild of America Award, a Daytime Emmy Award, six Ariel Awards, and the Golden Lion.

Major associations

Academy Awards

British Academy Film Awards

Golden Globe Awards

Other awards and nominations

Annie Awards

Ariel Awards

Cannes Film Festival

Critics' Choice Movie Awards

Daytime Emmy Award

Fangoria Chainsaw Awards

Goya Awards

Gotham Awards

Hollywood Walk of Fame

Hugo Awards

Independent Spirit Awards

Saturn Awards

Venice Film Festival

Other awards

References

Lists of awards received by film director